Martin Gero (born July 6, 1977 in Geneva, Switzerland) is a Canadian screenwriter and co-executive producer for Stargate Atlantis and the creator of Blindspot.

Born in Switzerland, Gero spent much of his childhood in Ottawa, Ontario. He attended Canterbury High School for Dramatic Arts and Ryerson University in Toronto, which he ended up dropping out of in his last year. He co-wrote and directed the Toronto International Film Festival romantic comedy favourite Young People Fucking,  is a Writer/Supervising Producer on the HBO series Bored to Death, and is set to direct the new Playboy movie.

Filmography

Films
YPF (2008)
Grado 3 (2009)
The Lovebirds (2020)

Television
The Holmes Show (2002)
Stargate: Atlantis (2005–2009)
Stargate SG-1 (2005–2007)
Stargate Universe (2009–2011)
Bored to Death (2009–2011)
The L.A. Complex (2012)
Dark Matter (2015)
Blindspot (2015–2020)
Deception (2018)
Connecting (2020)
Kung Fu (2021)
Quantum Leap (2022–present)

References

External links

Writers from Ottawa
1977 births
Living people
Toronto Metropolitan University alumni
Canadian male screenwriters
Canadian Comedy Award winners
21st-century Canadian screenwriters
21st-century Canadian male writers